Staurois is a small genus of minuscule true frogs. Most species in the genus are restricted to Borneo, but two species are from the Philippines.  This genus is a quite ancient member of the true frog family, Ranidae. They are typically found in or near rapidly flowing, small rocky streams, and are sometimes known as splash frogs or foot-flagging frogs. The latter name refers to their unusual behavior of conspicuously waving their hindlegs and feet, as a way of signalling other members of the species. Similar behavior has also been documented in other frog genera, notably Hylodes and Micrixalus.

Species
The six currently recognized species in the genus are:
 Staurois guttatus  - Borneo; formerly included in S. natator
 Staurois latopalmatus  - Borneo
 Staurois natator  - Philippines
 Staurois nubilus  - Philippines; formerly included in S. natator
 Staurois parvus  - Borneo; sometimes included in S. tuberilinguis
 Staurois tuberilinguis  - Borneo

References

 
 Matsui, Masafumi; Mohamed, Maryati; Shimada, Tomohiko & Sudin, Ahmad (2007): Resurrection of Staurois parvus from S. tuberilinguis from Borneo (Amphibia, Ranidae). Zool. Sci. 24(1): 101–106.  (HTML abstract)
 Stuart, Bryan L. (2008): The phylogenetic problem of Huia (Amphibia: Ranidae). Mol. Phylogenet. Evol. 46(1): 49–60.  (HTMl abstract)

 
Amphibian genera
Taxa named by Edward Drinker Cope